Halcones Football Club is a Guatemalan football club based in Huehuetenango, Guatemala.

They compete in the Liga Nacional, the top division in the nation, and play their home matches at the Estadio Los Cuchumatanes.

The club was founded as Peñarol La Mesilla in 2006, however in 2012–13 season the club changed their name to Halcones FC.

Current squad

Notes

External links
Official site

Football clubs in Guatemala
Huehuetenango Department
2006 establishments in Guatemala